EduCARE India stands for 'Education & Community Applied Research Establishment in India', a community development institutional organisation that has been working with local communities and young talented students from higher education institutions / universities such as Panjab University, Chandigarh and Central University of Himachal Pradesh and other international universities to conduct community based education and applied research, organisation of seminars, conferences, exhibitions and an international internship and exchange program along with AIESEC

Area of work
EduCARE India develops new concepts and strategies in the field of community education, sustainable development and welfare in India.

The focus areas of work includes marginalised community empowerment, women's education and  empowerment, sustainable social microfinance, rural waste management, renewable energies,  organic farming, forestation and wildlife conservation.

Organisation
EduCARE India, is a registered NGO / not-for-profit Trust.

Project GlobalPEACE
Its Project GlobalPEACE (Global Perspectives through Education & Cultural Exchange) engages volunteers from foreign countries for international internship in India through its international internship programme in India to promote peace, global citizenship and global perspectives in Indian students and youth.

International internship in India
'i.e.India' and 'Experience India' are two popular and successful international internship and volunteering programmes developed and run by EduCARE India since 2005.

References

External links 
 Educare India website
 http://www.aiesec.org/cms/aiesec/AI/Press/inthenews/

1994 establishments in Chandigarh
Social enterprises
Social welfare charities
Educational organisations based in India
Organizations established in 1994
Educational charities
Organisations based in Chandigarh
Buildings and structures in Mohali